Martinovići is a village in the municipality of Gusinje, Montenegro.

Anthropology
The village is Albanian-inhabited, being a Kelmendi settlement.

Demographics

According to the 2011 census, its population was 532.

Notable people
 Liri Berisha,  Albanian pediatrician
 Musë Prelvukaj, Albanian painter

References

Sources

Populated places in Gusinje Municipality
Albanian communities in Montenegro